Monsignor Urban Federer   (born 17 August 1968) is a Swiss prelate of the Catholic Church. A member of the Order of St. Benedict, he is the current Abbot of Einsiedeln Abbey and Fahr Convent. Prior to serving as abbot, Federer was the Prior and Vicar General of Einsielden Abbey and the editor-in-chief of Salve, the abbey's official magazine. In 2017, he was made a Knight of the Pontifical Equestrian Order of the Holy Sepulcher of Jerusalem.

Early life and family 
Urban Federer was born in Zürich on 17 August 1968. He is a member of the Federer family, who are part of the Bürgergemeinde of Berneck, St. Gallen, and is the brother of the Swiss politician Barbara Schmid-Federer. He is the great-great-grandson of the politician Josef Zemp, who was the first member of a conservative party to be elected to the Federal Council of Switzerland. He is also related to the politician Ida Glanzmann-Hunkeler, the Catholic priest Heinrich Federer, and former tennis player Roger Federer, the latter whose children he baptized.

Ecclesiastical career 
Federer attended the Einsiedeln Convent School and Saint Meinrad Seminary and School of Theology from 1985 to 1988 before joining the Order of Saint Benedict and beginning his novitiate at Einsiedeln Abbey. He made his final vows on 1 November 1992 and received the sacrament of holy orders on 11 June 1994. He studied philosophy and theology at the abbey's theological home school and completed a licentiate degree in German studies and history at the University of Fribourg. He also completed Gregorian chant training in Germany.

In 2001, Federer worked as a religion, German language, and history teacher at the abbey's grammar school. In 2007 he received his doctorate with a dissertation in medieval German studies on mystical experience in literary dialogue between Heinrich von Nördlingen and Margaretha Ebner in the 14th century.

In 2010, Federer was appointed as Prior and Vicar General of Einsieldeln Abbey. He was made editor-in-chief of the abbey's magazine, Salve, and a board member of the Einsiedler Welttheater-Gesellschaft. He is also a cantor and the choral master. He was elected as abbot on 23 November 2013 by fifty-five voting monks. Pope Francis confirmed his election on 10 December 2013. His inauguration took place on 22 December 2013, performed by Bishop Markus Büchel. As abbot, he is also a member of the Swiss Bishops' Conference and has jurisdiction over Fahr Convent.

In 2017, Federer was appointed as a Knight of the Pontifical Equestrian Order of the Holy Sepulcher of Jersulaem by Cardinal Edwin Frederick O'Brien and was invested into the order on 18 March 2017 at Abbey of Saint-Maurice d'Agaune by Bishop Pier Giacomo Grampa.

References 

Living people
1968 births
20th-century Swiss Roman Catholic priests
21st-century Swiss Roman Catholic priests
Benedictine priors
Choristers
Urban
Knights of the Holy Sepulchre
People from Zürich
Swiss abbots
Swiss Benedictines
Swiss magazine editors
University of Fribourg alumni